Tom Leith was an American football and basketball coach.  He was the head football coach at Adrian College in Adrian, Michigan for two seasons, from 1911 to 1912, compiling a record of 12–4.  Leith was also the head basketball coach at Adrian from 1911 to 1913, tallying a mark of 4–9.

Athletics 
Leith was a star athlete while at Michigan State Normal College, now known as Eastern Michigan University. It was reported that he never lost a track event he competed in and was player-coach for the football team. His athletic accomplishments earned him a scholarship to Syracuse University in 1909 where he was a member of the football, baseball, and track teams.

Leith returned to Michigan in 1911 and became the head coach for the football and basketball teams at Adrian College. His time as Adrian coach was marked with success but also mired in controversy. In 1911, the Adrian team was forced to forfeit its win over Hillsdale College due to ineligible players. Two of Adrian's star players were deemed academically ineligible by the Adrian faculty after it was determined they forged credits to gain admittance to the college. Within two minutes of the game's start, however, Leith ordered the two men in the game in order to stop Hillsdale from scoring. Leith only admitted to the ruse after severe cross-examination by the MIAA board. Adrian was expelled from the conference after the incident and was only invited back after Leith resigned in 1913. Leith organized and held the first invitational track and field competition at a Michigan private college while at Adrian.

Leith would go on to coach the track team at Detroit University where he would again become embroiled in an eligibility scandal. His team was denied entry to an invitational by the MIAA because one of his athletes was not eligible, but Leith contended that he would not have entered the athlete. 

He also coached football for Brighton High School.

Politics 
Leith was Mayor for the city of Brighton winning reelection in 1949. He then campaigned for the 1950 Republican nomination for Governor of Michigan, his stated goals were "take state government out of the red and take the Reds out of state government." Leith received 8,460 votes, just 1.52% of the total vote, losing to Harry Kelly.

Personal life 
Leith married Ethel Duncan in 1909 while they were students at Michigan State Normal College. They secretly eloped and only told their families five months later.

Leith was involved in real estate in the Brighton area and opened the Michigan Military Academy in Island Park, MI.

Leith died in 1960 at age 71.

Head coaching record

Football

References

Year of birth missing
Year of death missing
Adrian Bulldogs football coaches
Adrian Bulldogs men's basketball coaches